Espoo railway station is a railway station in the district of Espoon keskus in the city of Espoo, Finland.

Before October 25, 2015, Espoo was the station in Espoo city that also served long-distance trains, but since then Leppävaara railway station has had that role in Espoo. 

The old Espoo station was built in 1903 according to plans by the architect Bruno Granholm. The station was expanded in 1909. The station building has many ornamental details. The station acted as the Espoo station building from 1903 to 1981, and the post office was also moved to the station as soon as it was finished, when the offices of the stationmaster and post officer were combined. 

The Espoo station is on the bridge over the tracks, and the post office is to the south of the tracks.

Connections
Bus routes:
118, 531, 542, 241(V), 244(K), 245 (winter only), 245A (summer only), 246(K, T, KT), 134, 136, 200, 213, 235N, 243(K), 565, 566, 168, 169

The station environment
The old station building has been present for over a century, but the tracks on both sides of it have changed. The tunnel through the city rock wasn't there originally; instead the tracks went past the rock on the north side at Läntinen jokitie. Also the cut face on the east side of the rock was made later. A road, Vanha ratavalli, goes along the old route of the tracks. At both places, traces of the tracks' old route could be seen in the ground as late as winter 2004.

Platforms
Platform one serves trains towards Kirkkonummi. On the other side of the platform is also a bus stop and a taxi station.

The middle platform is divided into platforms two and three. Platform two serves trains from Kirkkonummi to Helsinki. Platforms three and four used to serve E trains to Helsinki but are currently unused after E trains' terminus was moved further to Kauklahti.

On the other side of platform four is the Espoo market square and a turning point for buses going northwards, and also the Espoontori shopping centre.

An extension of the Leppävaara city railway has been proposed to reach the Espoo station to be able to increase local train traffic on the rantarata (Helsinki-Turku) tracks between Helsinki and Espoo.

References

External links 

Railway stations designed by Bruno Granholm
Railway stations in Espoo
Railway stations opened in 1903